Nubiluz De La Trinidad Rangel Quintero (born 13 August 1993) is a Venezuelan footballer who plays as a defender for Chilean club Colo-Colo and the Venezuela women's national team.

International career
Rangel represented Venezuela at two Central American and Caribbean Games editions (2014 and 2018) and the 2018 Copa América Femenina.

References

1993 births
Living people
Women's association football defenders
Venezuelan women's footballers
People from San Cristóbal, Táchira
Venezuela women's international footballers
Competitors at the 2014 Central American and Caribbean Games
Cúcuta Deportivo footballers
Atlético Nacional footballers
Colo-Colo (women) footballers
Venezuelan expatriate women's footballers
Venezuelan expatriate sportspeople in Trinidad and Tobago
Expatriate  footballers in Trinidad and Tobago
Venezuelan expatriate sportspeople in Paraguay
Expatriate women's footballers in Paraguay
Venezuelan expatriate sportspeople in Colombia
Expatriate women's footballers in Colombia
Venezuelan expatriate sportspeople in Chile
Expatriate women's footballers in Chile